Mangora acalypha, also known by its common name cricket-bat orbweaver, is a species of spider in the family Araneidae, found throughout the Palearctic realm. This species was originally described by Charles Athanase Walckenaer in 1802 as Aranea acalypha.

Habitat 
Mangora acalypha is common in meadows, forests and gardens.

References

Araneidae
Spiders described in 1802
Palearctic spiders
Taxa named by Charles Athanase Walckenaer